The Gare de l'Est (English: "Station of the East" or "East station"), officially Paris-Est, is one of the six large mainline railway station termini in Paris, France. It is located in the 10th arrondissement, not far southeast from the Gare du Nord, facing the Boulevard de Strasbourg, part of the north–south axis of Paris created by Georges-Eugène Haussmann.

Opened in 1849, it is currently the fifth-busiest of the six main railway stations in Paris before the Gare d'Austerlitz. The Gare de l'Est is the western terminus of the Paris–Strasbourg railway and Paris–Mulhouse railway which then proceeds to Basel, Switzerland.

History

The Gare de l'Est was opened in 1849 by the Compagnie du Chemin de Fer de Paris à Strasbourg (Paris–Strasbourg Railway Company) under the name "Strasbourg platform" (Embarcadère de Strasbourg); an official inauguration with President Louis Napoléon Bonaparte took place the next year. The platform corresponds today with the hall for main-line trains. Designed by architect François Duquesnay, it was renamed the "Gare de l'Est" in 1854, after the expansion of service to Mulhouse.

Renovations followed in 1885 and 1900, as part of Haussmann's renovation of Paris. In 1931, it was doubled in size, with the new part of the station built symmetrically with the old part. This transformation changed the surrounding neighbourhood significantly. At the top of the west facade of the Gare de l'Est is a statue by the sculptor Philippe Joseph Henri Lemaire, representing the city of Strasbourg, while the east end of the station is crowned by a statue personifying Verdun, by Varenne. These two cities are important destinations serviced by Gare de l'Est. On 4 October 1883, the Gare de l'Est saw the first departure of the Orient Express for Istanbul.

The Gare de l'Est is the terminus of a strategic railway network extending towards the eastern part of France, and it saw large mobilizations of French troops, most notably in 1914, at the beginning of World War I. In the main-line train hall, a monumental painting by Albert Herter, Le Départ des poilus, août 1914 dating from 1926, illustrates the departure of these soldiers for the Western front. The SNCF started LGV Est Européenne services from the Gare de l'Est on 10 June 2007, with TGV and Intercity-Express (ICE) services to Northeastern France, Luxembourg, Southern Germany and Switzerland. Trains are initially planned to run at 320 km/h (198 mph), with the potential to run at 350 km/h (217 mph), cutting travel times by up to 2 hours.

Train services
The following services currently call at Paris-Est:

EuroNight Paris Est - Strasbourg - Berlin - Warsaw - Brest - Minsk - Moscow
High speed services (TGV inOui ) Paris Est - Reims
High speed services (TGV inOui ) Paris Est - Reims - Charleville-Mézières - Sedan
High speed services TGV Paris Est - Champagne Adrennes TGV - Chalons-en-Champagne - Bar-le-Duc
High speed services TGV Paris Est - (Champagne Ardennes TGV/Meuse TGV) - Nancy
High speed services TGV Paris Est - Nancy - Epinal - Remiremont
High speed services TGV Paris Est - Nancy - Saint-Dié-des-Vosges
High speed services TGV Paris Est - Nancy - Strasbourg
High speed services TGV Paris Est - (Meuse TGV) - Metz
High speed services TGV Paris Est - Metz - Thionville - Luxembourg
High speed services TGV/ICE Paris Est - Saarbrücken - Kaiserslautern - Mannheim - Frankfurt
High speed services TGV Paris Est - (Saverne) - Strasbourg
High speed services TGV Paris Est - Strasbourg - Colmar
High speed services TGV/ICE Paris Est - Strasbourg - Karlsruhe - Stuttgart
High speed services TGV/ICE Paris Est - Strasbourg - Karlsruhe - Stuttgart - Ulm - Augsburg - Munich
Regional services TER Grand Est (C2) Paris Est - Chateau-Thierry - Épernay - Chalons-en-Champagne - St Dizier
Regional services Transilien Paris Est - Meaux - Chateau Thierry
Regional services Transilien Paris Est - Meaux - La Ferte-Milon
Regional services Transilien Paris Est - Chelles Gournay - Meaux
Regional services Transilien Paris Est - Tournan - Coulommiers
Regional services Transilien Paris Est - Longueville - Provins

Metro services

 Métro:
 Lines 4 (Porte de Clignancourt—Porte d'Orléans) and 5 (Place d'Italie - Bobigny – Pablo Picasso): service to the Gare du Nord.
 Line 7 (La Courneuve – 8 Mai 1945-Mairie d'Ivry/Villejuif – Louis Aragon (Paris Métro))
 Travelling between Gare de l'Est and other Paris main line stations:
 Gare du Nord: Walk to the station, or take Métro Line 4 or 5.
 Gare Montparnasse: Take Métro Line 4.
 Gare de Lyon: Take Métro Line 4 to Châtelet and then Line 1, 14 or RER A to Gare de Lyon, or take bus 65.
 Gare d'Austerlitz: Take Métro Line 5.
 Gare Saint-Lazare: Take Métro Line 7 to Opéra and then Line 3 to Saint-Lazare, or take RER E from Magenta (connected to Gare du Nord).
Travelling to points of interest
 Disneyland Paris: Take Métro Line 4 to Gare de Châtelet – Les Halles then take the RER Line A to Marne-la-Vallée – Chessy.

Destinations served from the Gare de l'Est

See also
List of Paris railway stations
 List of stations of the Paris RER
 List of stations of the Paris Métro

References

External links

 
 
Transilien network map
Transilien website

Railway stations in France opened in 1849
Buildings and structures in the 10th arrondissement of Paris
Railway termini in Paris
SNCF